Bill Watkins DFC (18 January 1923 – 15 March 2005) was a Welsh cricketer and decorated World War II aviator.  Watkins was a right-handed batsman who bowled right-arm leg break googly.  He was born at Swansea, Glamorgan.

World War II service
Watkins served in the Royal Air Force during the Second World War, enlisting when he was 18 in 1941 and serving with 514 Squadron at Waterbeach, Cambridgeshire.  During the course of the war he took part in 31 missions over Germany in his Lancaster bomber, earning him by war's end the Distinguished Flying Cross.

Post World War II service
Following the end of the war, Watkins left the Royal Air Force and returned to his native Swansea, where he worked as a metallurgist for British Aluminium and ALCOA.  Watkins played a single first-class match for Glamorgan in 1950 against Hampshire at St. Helen's. A keen sportsman, he also had trials with the rugby league club Wigan.

Watkins died at Killay, Glamorgan on 15 March 2005.

References

External links
Bill Watkins at Cricinfo
Bill Watkins at CricketArchive

a

1923 births
2005 deaths
British metallurgists
Cricketers from Swansea
Glamorgan cricketers
Recipients of the Distinguished Flying Cross (United Kingdom)
Royal Air Force personnel of World War II
Rugby league players from Swansea
Welsh cricketers
Welsh rugby league players